Marcelle Tassencourt (28 May 1914 – 18 December 2001) was a French actress and theatre director.

In 1960, she was appointed head of the Théâtre Montansier in Versailles. She was a drama teacher at the Versailles conservatory. Among her students were Catherine Frot, Pierre Pradinas, George Corraface, Fanny Cottençon, Muriel Mayette, Anne Benoît and Francis Perrin who, some years after he finished the national conservatory, became in turn director of the Théâtre Montansier. Thierry Maulnier was her husband.

Theatre

Comedian 
1937: Le Simoun by Henri-René Lenormand, directed by Camille Corney, Théâtre des Célestins
1946: Auprès de ma blonde by Marcel Achard, directed by Pierre Fresnay, Théâtre de la Michodière
1948: Le Voleur d'enfants by Jules Supervielle, directed by Raymond Rouleau, Théâtre de l'Œuvre
1949: Le Sourire de la Joconde by Aldous Huxley, directed by Raymond Rouleau, Théâtre de l'Œuvre
1949: Jeanne et ses juges by Thierry Maulnier, directed by Maurice Cazeneuve, parvise of Rouen Cathedral
1950: Le Cid by Corneille, directed by Jean Vilar, Festival d'Avignon
1950: Le Profanateur by Thierry Maulnier, directed by Jean Vilar, Festival d'Avignon
1952: Le Profanateur by Thierry Maulnier, directed by Tania Balachova, Théâtre Antoine 
1952: Le Cocotier by Jean Guitton, directed by Paule Rolle, Théâtre du Gymnase
1953: La Maison de la nuit by Thierry Maulnier, directed by Marcelle Tassencourt and Michel Vitold, Théâtre Hébertot 
1954: Man's Fate by André Malraux, directed by Marcelle Tassencourt, Théâtre Hébertot 
1955: Le Prince d'Égypte by Christopher Fry, directed by Marcelle Tassencourt, Théâtre du Vieux-Colombier
1955: Lady Windermere's Fan by Oscar Wilde, directed by Marcelle Tassencourt, Théâtre Hébertot
1956: Lady Windermere's Fan by Oscar Wilde, directed by Marcelle Tassencourt, Théâtre Daunou
1957: Wako, l’abominable homme des neiges by Roger Duchemin, directed by Jean Le Poulain, Théâtre Hébertot
1958: Procès à Jésus by Diego Fabbri, directed by Marcelle Tassencourt, Théâtre Hébertot
1960: Le Sexe et le néant by Thierry Maulnier, directed by Marcelle Tassencourt, Théâtre de l'Athénée 
1962: Édouard mon fils by Robert Morley and Noel Langley, directed by Maurice Guillaud, Théâtre Montansier
1964: Édouard mon fils by Robert Morley and Noel Langley, directed by Maurice Guillaud, Théâtre Montparnasse
1965: Knock ou le triomphe de la médecine by Jules Romains, directed by Marcelle Tassencourt, Théâtre Montansier, Théâtre Montparnasse
1965:  Procès à Jésus by Diego Fabbri, Théâtre Montansier de Versailles
1966: Topaze by Marcel Pagnol, directed by Marcelle Tassencourt, Théâtre Hébertot
1967: : Topaze by Marcel Pagnol, directed by Marcelle Tassencourt, TV director Pierre Sabbagh, Théâtre Marigny

Theatre director 
1952: Dialogues des carmélites by Georges Bernanos, Théâtre Hébertot
1953: La Maison de la nuit by Thierry Maulnier, directed by Tassancourt with Michel Vitold, Théâtre Hébertot 
1954: Man's Fate by André Malraux, Théâtre Hébertot
1955: Le Prince d'Égypte by Christopher Fry, Théâtre du Vieux-Colombier
1956: Les Étendards du roi by Adolfo Costa du Rels, Théâtre du Vieux Colombier, Théâtre Hébertot
1956: La Belle Dame sans merci by Jean Le Marois after John Keats, Théâtre Hébertot
1955: Lady Windermere's Fan by Oscar Wilde, Théâtre Hébertot
1956: Lady Windermere's Fan by Oscar Wilde, Théâtre Daunou 
1956: La Nuit romaine by Albert Vidalie, Théâtre Hébertot
1958: Procès à Jésus by Diego Fabbri, Théâtre Hébertot
1958: Éboulement au quai nord by Ugo Betti, 
1959: L'Homme de guerre by François Ponthier, Comédie de Paris
1959: Long Day's Journey into Night by Eugene O'Neill, Théâtre Hébertot
1959: Le Dessous des cartes by André Gillois, Théâtre Hébertot
1960: Le Sexe et le néant by Thierry Maulnier, Théâtre de l'Athénée
1960: Le Signe du feu by Diego Fabbri, Théâtre Hébertot
1961: Le Dialogue des carmélites by Georges Bernanos, Comédie-Française
1961: Le Christ recrucifié by Nikos Kazantzakis, Théâtre Montansier
1962: Le Christ recrucifié by Nikos Kazantaákis, Théâtre de l'Odéon
1963: Andromaque by Racine, Théâtre Montparnasse
1963: Othello by William Shakespeare, Théâtre de l'Odéon
1964: Britannicus by Racine, Théâtre Montparnasse
1965: Knock ou le triomphe de la médecine by Jules Romains, Théâtre Montparnasse
1965: Agnès Bernauer by Friedrich Hebbel, Théâtre de l'Odéon
1965: Procès à Jésus by Diego Fabbri, Théâtre Montansier
1966: Topaze by Marcel Pagnol, Théâtre Hébertot
1967: Monsieur et Madame Molière by Jacques Chabannes, Théâtre de Puteaux
1967: Lorenzaccio by Alfred de Musset, Théâtre Montansier 
1967: Andromaque by Racine, Théâtre Montparnasse
1967: The Taming of the Shrew by William Shakespeare, Théâtre des Mathurins 
1969: Le Menteur by Carlo Goldoni, Théâtre de la Renaissance
1970: The Merchant of Venice by William Shakespeare, Théâtre Édouard VII
1972: Fils de personne by Henri de Montherlant, Théâtre Montansier
1972: Médée, by Franz Grillparzer, Théâtre Montansier
1977: Phèdre by Racine, Grand Trianon Festival de Versailles
1978: Britannicus by Racine, Grand Trianon, Festival de Versailles
1978: L'Avocat du diable by Dore Schary, Théâtre Montansier
1979: Le Bourgeois gentilhomme by Molière, Théâtre Mogador
1979: Au théâtre ce soir : La Veuve rusée by Carlo Goldoni, TV director Pierre Sabbagh, Théâtre Marigny
1979: Athalie by Racine, Orangerie du château, Festival de Versailles
1980: Arlequin, serviteur de deux maîtres by Carlo Goldoni, Théâtre Montansier
1980: La Thébaïde by Racine, Orangerie du château, Festival de Versailles
1983: Andromaque by Racine, Festival de Versailles
1983: Madame... pas dame by Robert Favart, Théâtre Montansier
1984: Madame... pas dame by Robert Favart, Théâtre des Bouffes-Parisiens 
1984: Le Cid by Corneille, Festival de Versailles
1986: Horace by Corneille, Festival de Versailles Grand Trianon
1987: Polyeucte by Corneille, Festival de Versailles, Grand Trianon
1988: Britannicus by Racine, Grand Trianon, Festival de Versailles
1988: Les Fourberies de Scapin by Molière, Grand Trianon in Versailles
1991: Jeanne et les juges by Thierry Maulnier, Théâtre Édouard VII
1992: La Maison de la nuit by Thierry Maulnier, Théâtre 14 Jean-Marie Serreau
1994: Britannicus by Racine, Théâtre de l'Ouest parisien
1995: The Just Assassins by Albert Camus, Théâtre de l'Ouest parisien

Filmography

Cinema 
 1945: L'Ennemi secret, short film by  J. K. Raymond-Millet
 1965: Un mari à prix fixe by Claude de Givray
 1989: À deux minutes près by Éric Le Hung

Television 
 1952: Le Profanateur, telefilm by René Lucot
 1967: Au théâtre ce soir: Topaze by Marcel Pagnol, TV director Pierre Sabbagh
 1975: La Passion d'Anna Karénine, telefilm by Yves-André Hubert
 1978: Il était un musicien, série (season 1, episode 4 : Monsieur Saint-Saëns), TV director Claude Chabrol
 1997: Maître Da Costa, serial (season 1, episode 1 : Les Témoins de l’oubli)

External links 
 
 Les Archives du spectacle

20th-century French actresses
French theatre managers and producers
Women theatre managers and producers
French theatre directors
1914 births
People from Neuilly-sur-Seine
2001 deaths